The Checks were a New Zealand rock band known for blues-driven, high-energy rock. The group released three albums, Hunting Whales, Alice by the Moon and Deadly Summer Sway and toured extensively before splitting up in 2012.

History 

The Checks were formed in 2002 when Takapuna Grammar School friends Ed Knowles, Sven Pettersen, Karel Chabera, Jacob Moore and Callum Martin came together over a mutual love of music. The newly formed band got their first break by impressing bFM breakfast DJ Hugh Sundae, and went on to win the Auckland regional finals of the Smokefreerockquest, qualifying them for the 2003 finals. In 2004 the group won Most Promising New Act at the bNet Music Awards, and then picked up the Most b.Net Radio Play award for their song "Mercedes Children" in 2005. The Checks reputation grew and with only one single released, the group were personally selected by R.E.M. to open for them on their 2005 New Zealand tour, and were invited by NME editor Conor McNicholas to join the NME New Music Tour of the UK in 2005.

The Checks were signed for a four-album deal with UK record label Full Time Hobby (through Sony/BMG UK) and moved to England to record their debut LP. Hunting Whales was released in October 2007 and spent four weeks in the New Zealand album charts, peaking at number 21. Despite some success in the UK, Full Time Hobby records could no longer support the band. The Checks could not sustain living in the UK and return to New Zealand, recording under their own label, Pie Club Records. As well as touring in New Zealand, Australia, Europe and the United States, the Checks also played support gigs for The Hives, Oasis, Jet, Muse, The Killers and AC/DC.

In 2008 the group recorded new song "There is a Field", released as a non-album digital download, before recording their self-produced second album Alice by the Moon in Auckland in early 2009. Alice by the Moon was released in June 2009 to critical acclaim and peaked at number 13 in the New Zealand album charts. In 2010 Alice by the Moon was shortlisted for the Taite Music Prize and won Rock Album at the 2010 NZ Music Awards, with the Checks also being nominated for Best Group.

The group recorded their third album Deadly Summer Sway in 2011 which was also released to favourable reviews. The group released a trilogy of music videos for the songs "Candyman Shimmer", "Ready To Die"	and "Perfect Lover", directed by the Trophywife collective.

In August 2012, the Checks announced they were breaking up. No reason was given for the split.

Members 

 Edward Knowles – vocals
 Sven Pettersen – lead guitar
 Callum Martin – guitar, backing vocals
 Karel Chabera Jr. – bass guitar
 Jacob Moore – drums, backing vocals

Discography

Albums

Singles

Music videos

Awards 

|-
| 2004
| The Checks
| bNet Music Awards - Most Promising New Act 
| 
|-
| 2005
| "Mercedes Children"
| bNet Music Awards - Most b.Net Radio Play
| 
|-
| 2005
| "What You Heard"
| NZ Music Awards - Breakthrough Artist of the Year
| 
|-
| 2010
| Alice by the Moon
| NZ Music Awards - Best Group 
| 
|-
| 2010
| Alice by the Moon
| NZ Music Awards - Best Rock Album
| 
|-
| 2010
| Alice by the Moon
| Taite Music Prize - Finalist
| 
|-
| 2012
| Deadly Summer Sway
| NZ Music Awards - Best Rock Album 
| 
|}

References

New Zealand blues rock musical groups
People educated at Takapuna Grammar School
New Zealand garage rock groups